Santi Cosma e Damiano is a Roman Catholic church, located onv Via Persichello in the district of Persico in the comune of Persico Dosimo in the province of Cremona, region of Lombardy, Italy.

History
This church was erected from the 17th to 18th centuries. The prior church was destroyed by an earthquake in 1694. The slender and tall bell-tower was erected in 1904 by the architect Adelchi Barbieri. In 2014, the church was closed due to damage to the roof.

References

Churches in the province of Cremona
18th-century Roman Catholic church buildings in Italy